In a Coma: 1995-2005 is the title of the Matthew Good compilation album, featuring both his solo work and work from the Matthew Good Band.

Details
The album is often titled In a Coma: 1995-2005, and notably lacks either "best of" or "greatest hits" in the official title. It was released on September 20, 2005. However, even before its release, the album reached #1 on Amazon.ca via pre-orders, and 200 signed copies sold out from Matthew Good's official site in under four hours.

The album is available in two forms: the regular version and the deluxe. The regular only includes disc one, the deluxe features two audio discs and one DVD. The first disc contains nearly all of the singles released by the Matthew Good Band and Matt solo, lacking only Good's most recent singles ("Near Fantastica", "It's Been a While Since I Was Your Man", "In Love with a Bad Idea") and the singles from the album The Audio of Being ("Carmelina", "Anti-Pop"). The first disc also contains two new songs ("Oh Be Joyful", "Big City Life"), as well as a b-side ("Pony Boy") recorded during the sessions for The Audio of Being.

For the second disc, Good entered the studio solo with an acoustic guitar and recorded new versions of several songs from his extensive catalog. For added effect, Good miked the street outside the studio as he performed, adding an ambiance to the session that Good particularly enjoyed. Given the scarcity of the two MGB EPs Lo-Fi B-Sides and Loser Anthems, Good decided to add the two discs to the latter half of the second disc as a nod to fans.

The DVD in the deluxe package includes every promotional video filmed during Good's career, solo and with the Matthew Good Band. As a bonus, Good recorded a commentary track with Bill Morrison, who directed the majority of the videos. The DVD also includes an animated video for "While We Were Hunting Rabbits", which was created by students at Sheridan College. After Good realized that his favourite songs had not been included in the package, a section featuring those songs accompanied by a slideshow of images similar to the cover artwork was added to the disc.

"Oh Be Joyful", the first single from In a Coma, was released on July 25, 2005. The song's release was accompanied by a video that many fans found confusing, as it contained little more than a burning fireplace. Matthew Good was quick to defend his video on his blog, saying that it was "one of the greatest temporary musical screen savers of all time" and that it was only intended to appear on his site, not to play on Much Music.

Track listing

Regular release
 "Oh Be Joyful"  – 3:52 (previously unreleased)
 "Big City Life"  – 4:15 (previously unreleased)
 "Alert Status Red"  – 4:19 (from White Light Rock & Roll Review)
 "Weapon"  – 6:06 (from Avalanche)
 "In a World Called Catastrophe"  – 5:59 (from Avalanche)
 "Hello Time Bomb"  – 3:56 (from Beautiful Midnight)
 "Load Me Up"  – 3:42 (from Beautiful Midnight)
 "Strange Days"  – 4:24 (from Beautiful Midnight)
 "The Future Is X-Rated"  – 3:46 (from Beautiful Midnight)
 "Everything Is Automatic"  – 4:18 (from Underdogs)
 "Rico"  – 3:27 (from Underdogs)
 "Apparitions"  – 5:14 (from Underdogs)
 "Indestructible"  – 3:26 (from Underdogs)
 "Symbolistic White Walls"  – 4:30 (from Last of the Ghetto Astronauts)
 "Haven't Slept In Years (Alternate)"  – 3:35 (from Raygun)
 "Alabama Motel Room"  – 3:20 (from Last of the Ghetto Astronauts)
 "Pony Boy"  – 4:03 (previously unreleased)
 "All Together" - 4:37 (previously unreleased) iTunes Pre-Order Track / ca.7digital.com exclusive

Deluxe Edition
Part One: Rooms (acoustic reworkings)
 "Truffle Pigs"  – 4:04
 "Tripoli"  – 4:51
 "Generation X-Wing"  – 3:55
 "Apparitions"  – 4:05
 "North American for Life"  – 3:13
 "Advertising on Police Cars"  – 4:08
 "Hello Time Bomb"  – 4:10
 "Strange Days"  – 4:55
 "Prime Time Deliverance"  – 4:22
Part Two: Loser Anthems
 "Flashdance II"  – 4:44
 "The Man from Harold Wood"  – 2:18
 "My Life as a Circus Clown"  – 2:46
 "Intermezzo: M. Good v. M. Trolley"  – 0:35
 "Flight Recorder from Viking 7"  – 5:34
 "Life Beyond the Minimum Safe Distance"  – 3:53
 "The Fine Art of Falling Apart"  – 3:39
Part Three: Lo-Fi B-Sides
 "Born to Kill"  – 5:14
 "Enjoy the Silence"  – 3:11
 "Fated"  – 3:31

Bonus DVD
Part One: Music Videos
 Alabama Motel Room
 Symbolistic White Walls
 Everything Is Automatic
 Indestructible
 Apparitions
 Rico
 Hello Time Bomb
 Load Me Up
 Strange Days
 The Future Is X-Rated
 Carmelina
 Anti-Pop
 Weapon
 In a World Called Catastrophe
 Alert Status Red
 It's Been a While Since I Was Your Man
 While We Were Hunting Rabbits (new video)
Part Two: The Making of "Rooms"
 The Making of "Rooms" Feature
Part Three: Matthew's picks with special slide show
 Avalanche
 A Long Way Down
 Pledge of Allegiance
 Blue Skies Over Bad Lands
 House of Smoke and Mirrors
Part Four: Discography

Personnel
Matthew Good Band performs from Last of the Ghetto Astronauts to Loser Anthems. Others are performed by Matthew Good.
Matthew Good Band
Matthew Good - vocals, guitar, cover concept (Underdogs), piano, percussion, additional producer, strings, writing & arrangement, art director, producer
Ian Browne - drums
Geoff Lloyd - Bass guitar (Last of the Ghetto Astronauts, Raygun, Underdogs)
Rich Priske - Bass guitar
Dave Genn - Guitar, Keyboards

Last of the Ghetto Astronauts
Dave Genn - Organ, Rhodes (not part of MGB at this time)
John Shepp - Producer, mixer
Terry Brown - Mixer ("Alabama Motel Room", "Symbolistic White Walls")
George Leger - Mastering
Recorded at Utopia Parkway Studios, Vancouver, British Columbia, Canada
Manufacturer: Darktown Records
Distributor: A&M Records, a division of PolyGram Inc.
Words and music by Matthew Good
Except "Alabama Motel Room", music by Good/Lloyd/Browne

Raygun
Dale Penner - Producer, engineer
Clif Norrell - Mixer
Stephen Marcussen - Mastering
Recorded at Greenhouse Studios, Burnaby, British Columbia, Canada
Words and music by Matthew Good

Underdogs
Todd Kerns performs backing vocals on "Everything Is Automatic" and "Rico" (not part of MGB)
Warne Livesey - Producer, engineer, mixer
Dean Maher - Assistant
Zach Blackstone - Engineer
Stephen Marcussen - Mastering
Recorded at Greenhouse Studios, Burnaby, British Columbia, Canada
Words by Matthew Good
Music by Matthew Good/Dave Genn
Except "Rico", music by Good/Browne/Lloyd/Genn

Lo-Fi B-Sides (Disc Two, Part Three) 
Warne Livesey - Producer, engineer, mixer

Beautiful Midnight
Todd Kerns (not part of MGB) performs backing vocals on "Hello Time Bomb"
Natasha Duprey - Phone Sex on "The Future is X-Rated"
Warne Livesey - Producer, Engineer, mixer
Zach Blackstone - Engineer
Steve Kaplan (BJG Studios, London) - Mixer
Tim Young - Mastering
Recorded at House of Brucifer, Vancouver, British Columbia, Canada
Words by Matthew Good
Music by Matthew Good/Dave Genn
Except "Load Me Up", music by Good/Genn/Browne/Priske

Loser Anthems (Disc Two, Part Two) 
Holly McNarland performs backing vocals on "Flight Recorder from Viking 7" (not part of MGB)

Avalanche
Pat Steward - Drums, Percussion
Richard Priske - Bass guitar, Additional Keyboards, Additional producer
Christian Thor Valdson - Electric Guitar
Vancouver Symphony Orchestra - Strings
Musica Intima - Choral Performances
Warne Livesey - Producer, engineer, mixer, strings Writing & Arrangement
Zach Blackstone - Engineer
Adam Ayan (Gateway Mastering) - Mastering
Recorded at Mushroom Studios, Vancouver, British Columbia, Canada
All songs by Matthew Good

White Light Rock & Roll Review
Pat Steward - Drums
Rich Priske - Bass guitar
Christian Thor Valdson - Electric Guitar
Warne Livesey - Producer, engineer, mixer
Scott Ternan - Assistant engineer
Joel Livesey - Assistant engineer
Zach Blackstone - Assistant engineer
Kirk McNally - Assistant engineer
Mastered by Tim Young at Metropolis, London, UK
Tim Young (Metropolis, London, England) - Mastering
Recorded at Mushroom Studios and Warehouse Studios, Vancouver, British Columbia, Canada
All songs by Matthew Good

New Songs ("Oh Be Joyful", "Big City Life") 
Ryan Dahle - Lead guitar, engineer
Pat Steward - Drums
Megan Bradfield - Bass guitar
Zach Blackstone - Engineer
Randy Staub - Mixer
George Marino - Mastering
Recorded at Warehouse Studios, Vancouver, British Columbia, Canada
All songs by Matthew Good

B-Sides ("Pony Boy") (unreleased from "The Audio of Being" sessions)
Matthew Good - Electric Guitar, vocals
Dave Genn - Electric Guitar, Keyboards
Rich Priske - Bass guitar
Ian Browne - Drums
Holly McNarland - Backing vocals
Warne Livesey - Producer, engineer, mixer
Recorded at Armoury Studios and Warehouse Studios, Vancouver, British Columbia, Canada
Words & Music by Matthew Good

Rooms
Recorded at Warehouse Studios, Vancouver, British Columbia, Canada
All songs by Matthew Good

Music videos
Videos features music, words, and band members from the album they were released on, information on those can be found on each album's page.
All videos directed by Bill Morrison
Except "Strange Days" (Morrison/Good), "Anti-Pop" (Chris Nelson), "Weapon" (officially Ante Kovac/Good, but Good fired Kovac halfway through the video), "In a World Called Catastrophe" (Kyle Davison), and "While We Were Hunting Rabbits (animation students of Sheridan College)

Note: Because most of this album is a compilation, the personnel varies from song to song, which is why the albums were listed during Disc One. The information here is condensed; full information can be retrieved on the album's original page.

References

Matthew Good albums
2005 greatest hits albums
2005 video albums
Music video compilation albums